Kim Commons (23 July 1951 — 23 June 2015) was an American chess International Master (IM) and Chess Olympiad winner.

Biography
In 1971, Kim Commons won California State Chess Championship, ahead of James Tarjan. In 1974, he tied with Peter Biyiasas for the American Open title. In 1976, he won three International Chess Tournaments in Bulgaria: Varna, Plovdiv and Primorsko.

Commons played for the United States in the 22nd Chess Olympiad in Haifa, winning team and individual gold medals with six wins, three draws and no losses.

He also played for United States in two World student team championships:
 In 1972, on the second reserve board in the 19th World Student Team Chess Championship in Graz (+6, =3, -2),
 In 1977, on first board in the 22nd World Student Team Chess Championship in Mexico City (+3, =3, -2).

In 1976, he was awarded the FIDE International Master (IM) title.

Commons stopped playing chess in later years.

He received a bachelor's degree in physics from University of California. For the second half of his life he lived in Arizona, where he was the founder and owner of Club Red, a Mesa music club.

References

External links

Kim Commons chess games at 365chess.com

1951 births
2015 deaths
People from Lancaster, California
Chess International Masters
American chess players
Chess Olympiad competitors
University of California, Los Angeles alumni